George Chapman AO is a surveyor, and businessman from Cairns, Queensland, Australia.  He has contributed to the community of Queensland as Chairman of Telecasters North Queensland, Ten Network Holdings, TAB Queensland, Cairns Port Authority, Chapman Group and Skyrail Pty Ltd.  Other significant contributions include his involvement in the Tjapukai Aboriginal Cultural Park, Cairns Regional Development Bureau, and the Great Barrier Reef Foundation.

In 2011, Chapman was a recipient of the Queensland Greats award.

In 2017, Chapman was inducted into the Queensland Business Leaders Hall of Fame.

Awards 
 Queensland Greats 2011
 Queensland Business Leaders Hall of Fame 2017

References

External links 
 Queensland Greats recipients 
Queensland Business Leaders Hall of Fame - 2017 Inductee digital story - George Chapman AO

Living people
Australian businesspeople
Australian of the Year Award winners
Date of birth missing (living people)
People from Cairns
Year of birth missing (living people)